The 1998–99 Wisconsin Badgers men's basketball team represented University of Wisconsin–Madison in the 1998–99 NCAA Division I men's basketball season. The head coach was Dick Bennett, coaching his fourth season with the Badgers. The team played their home games at the Kohl Center in Madison, Wisconsin and was a member of the Big Ten Conference.

Roster

Schedule

|-
!colspan=12| Regular Season

|-
!colspan=12| Big Ten tournament

|-
!colspan=12| NCAA tournament

References

Wisconsin Badgers men's basketball seasons
Wisconsin
Wisconsin
Wisconsin Badgers men's b
Wisconsin Badgers men's b